TiVo digital video recorders encompass a number of digital video recorder (DVR) models that TiVo Corporation designed.  Features may vary, but a common feature is that all of the units listed here require TiVo service and use its operating system.

TiVo units have been manufactured by various OEMs, including Philips, Sony, Pioneer, Toshiba, and Humax. Cisco Systems and Samsung joined forces with pay TV Provider Virgin Media (UK-only) to create the Virgin Media TiVo box. The OEMs license the software from TiVo Corporation.

To date, there have been seven "series" of TiVo units produced, with the seventh series, the Edge, released in October 2019.

DVR models

Series1 (1999)

The Series1 (retronym) was the original TiVo digital video recorder.

Series1 TiVo systems are based on PowerPC processors connected to MPEG-2 encoder/decoder chips and IDE/ATA hard drives. Series1 TiVo units used one or two drives of 13–60 GB.  Although not supported by TiVo or equipment manufacturers, larger drives can be added.

Series1 standalone

All standalone TiVo systems have coax/RF-in and an internal cable-ready tuner, analog video input—composite/RCA, and S-Video—for use with an external cable box or satellite receiver. The TiVo unit can use a serial cable or IR blasters to control the external receiver. They have coax/RF, composite/RCA, and S-Video output, and the DVD systems also have component out. Audio is RCA stereo, and the DVD systems also have digital optical out.
 CPU: IBM PowerPC 403GCX at 54 MHz
 RAM: 16 MB

Series1 DirecTV

Some TiVo systems are integrated with DirecTV receivers. These "DirecTiVo" recorders record the incoming satellite MPEG-2 digital stream directly to the hard disk without conversion. Because of this, and the fact that they have two tuners, DirecTiVos are able to record two programs at once. In addition, the lack of digital conversion allows recorded video to be of the same quality as live video. DirecTiVos have no MPEG encoder chip, and can only record DirecTV streams.
 CPU: IBM PowerPC 403GCX at 70-80 MHz
 RAM: 32 MB

Series2 (2002)

The Series2 was a complete redesign of the TiVo hardware.  It includes USB ports (for Ethernet and Wi-Fi adapters), a new CPU, and more RAM. The availability of network connectivity has spread to the software side, where new features like TiVoToGo and Home Media Engine applications are now supported.

Series2 TiVo systems are based on MIPS processors connected to MPEG-2 encoder/decoder chips and high-capacity IDE/ATA hard drives. Current Series2 units have drives of 40–250GB in size. Although not supported by TiVo or equipment manufacturers, larger drives can be added.

Series2 standalone

All standalone TiVo systems have coax/RF-in and an internal cable-ready tuner, analog video input—composite/RCA, and S-Video—for use with an external cable box or satellite receiver. The TiVo unit can use a serial cable or IR blasters to control the external receiver. They have coax/RF, composite/RCA, and S-Video output, and the DVD systems also have component out. Audio is RCA stereo, and the DVD systems also have digital optical out. The Series2 systems also have USB ports, currently used only to support network (wired Ethernet and WiFi) adapters. The early Series2 units, models starting with 110/130/140, have USB 1.1 hardware, while all other systems have USB 2.0.

Some models manufactured by Toshiba, Pioneer, and Humax, under license from TiVo, contain DVD-R/RW drives. The models can transfer recordings from the built-in hard drive to DVD Video-compliant discs, playable in most modern DVD systems. The video encoding on these models was modified to match the DVD standard so transferring to DVD does not require transcoding.

The Series2 standalones can only tune analog signals, so to comply with FCC rules on analog TV phaseout, models that record from over-the-air channels are no longer sold. The dual tuner (DT) models and the TCD542 (a revision of the TCD540) will only record from cable and satellite sources.

 CPU:
 1xx/2xx-series: NEC 5432 (MIPS), 166 MHz
 5xx-series: Broadcom BCM7317, 242 MHz
 6xx-series: Broadcom BCM7318, 266 MHz
 RAM:
 1xx/2xx/5xx-series: 32 MB of 133 MHz 16-bit DDR
 6xx-series: 64 MB of 133 MHz 16-bit DDR
 MPEG Encoder
 1xx/2xx/5xx-series: Broadcom BCM7040
 6xx-series: Two Broadcom BCM7042

Series2 DirecTV

Some TiVo systems are integrated with DirecTV receivers. These "DirecTiVo" recorders record the incoming satellite MPEG-2 digital stream directly to hard disk without conversion. Because of this and the fact that they have two tuners, DirecTiVos are able to record two programs at once. In addition, the lack of digital conversion allows recorded video to be of the same quality as live video. DirecTiVos have no MPEG encoder chip, and can only record DirecTV streams. However, DirecTV has disabled the networking capabilities on their systems, meaning DirecTiVo does not offer such features as multi-room viewing or TiVoToGo. Only the standalone systems can be networked without additional unsupported hacking.

The HR10-250 DirecTiVo units can also record HDTV to a 250GB hard drive, both from the DirecTV stream and over-the-air via a standard UHF- or VHF-capable antenna. They have four tuners (two DirecTV and two ATSC over-the-air) and, like the original DirecTiVo, can record two programs at once; further, the program guide is integrated between over-the-air and DirecTV so that all programs can be recorded and viewed in the same manner. Recording capacity is variable, up to 30 HD or 200 SD hours.

 CPU:
 HR10: 200 MHz

On July 8, 2006, DirecTV announced an upgrade to version 6.3 of the TiVo software for the HR10-250, the first major upgrade since this unit was released.  This upgrade includes features such as program grouping (folders), a much faster on-screen guide, and new sorting features.

In October 2007, DirecTV sent a message to all DirecTV TiVo R10 and HR10 users saying that they will be applying numerous features to the DirecTiVo. It include two features:

 Episode Recovery is a feature that will let you recover a previously deleted episode of a show. There will be a time frame of the time you could recover the episode, but the information has not been released.
Online Scheduling (broadcast programming) is a feature that will allow you to go to the DirecTV guide on the internet, and choose a television program to be recorded. This feature is popular with the TiVo Brand DVR's, but DirecTV's contract with TiVo did not allow them to implement the online features of the DirecTiVo.

Series3 HD (2006)

The Series3 TiVo was officially unveiled at the 2006 Consumer Electronics Show, and was released to the public on September 12, 2006.  In April 2010, it was superseded by the Series 4 "TiVo Premiere" and is supported but no longer manufactured by TiVo for North American markets.

The Series3 DVR features support for high-definition broadcasts and has two tuners. In North America, they each can receive analog and HDTV over-the-air (NTSC and ATSC) in addition to both analog and digital cable (QAM).  Encrypted digital cable is decoded through CableCARDs available from the cable providers.   satellite TV connections are not supported.  In Australia and New Zealand, the dual tuners support the recording of two digital (DVB-T) over-the-air signals at the same time, whilst playing back a third.

With the dual tuners, it can record or view any two sources simultaneously. For example, two over-the-air broadcasts, two cable programs, or any combination can be recorded at the same time. The initial hardware release (TCD648250B) was unable to take advantage of Multi-Stream CableCARDs and required the use of a pair of CableCARDs to enable its dual tuners with encrypted digital cable.  The follow-up Series3 models had an option of using either one Multi-Stream card or two single stream cards.

Switched Digital Video (SDV), a technology which allows cable providers to only send the channel streams being watched instead of the entire channel lineup in order to better manage bandwidth, requires a USB attachment to a separate tuning adapter available from the cable providers.

One HDMI port and two sets of component, S-video, and composite outputs are included.  The Series 3 is also the first DVR to feature THX-certified audio and video.  The unit is also equipped with two USB 2.0 ports, a Fast Ethernet port, and a telephone modem, which are all used to connect to the TiVo service.  The built-in wired Ethernet or an optional USB 802.11 wireless adapter can download video on demand from various providers. Multi-room viewing and transferring programs to and from a PC is allowed.  HD content may only be transferred between Series 3 units.

A Series 3 can be connected to several types of televisions and if necessary convert to the appropriate resolution.  This allows displaying HD channels on older TVs using composite or s-video connections.

Storage can be increased to 2 TB by replacement of the hard drive—something that can be done professionally, but is usually done by users familiar with how to perform PC drive replacement.  An external SATA port allows up to 1TB in additional storage when using TiVo-certified external hard drives.

 CPU: Broadcom BCM7038
 RAM: 128 MB for general CPU use- more for the encoders

Series4 Premiere (2010)

The Series4 TiVo Premiere was officially unveiled on March 2, 2010, and was released to the public on March 28, 2010.  The higher-end Premiere model features a more sophisticated remote and larger hard drive. The TiVo Premiere has the features of the Series 3 TiVos with the addition of support for 1080p high definition video, and a new high definition user interface using Haxe. It is also Energy Star compliant after cutting power consumption by 35% to 45%.  The slimmer unit relies on a single Multi-stream CableCARD ("M-Card") slot and uses a dual core processor delivering greater performance.  Communication speeds are claimed to be 3 to 5 times faster than a TiVo HD, and supports an optional QWERTY keyboard remote that communicates via Bluetooth (recently discontinued) .  Like the Series 3, it does not support analog video input from devices such as satellite television or AT&T U-verse set top boxes as do the Series 2 TiVos.  The new user interface is meant to seamlessly integrate features such as Rhapsody, Netflix, Amazon, Blockbuster, Hulu, and YouTube video, and make development of such applications easier through use of Adobe Stagecraft (Flash Lite 3.1 + Actionscript 2.0).  The operating system enhancement allows third party Flash applications similar to those possible with HME, and other Flash Lite consumer devices such as Chumby.  Such applications will be available from TiVo's application store.

Hardware:
CPU: Broadcom BCM7413  400MHZ dual core 1100 Dhrystone MIPS vs. TiVo HD's 400 DMIPS

Series5 Roamio (2013) 

The TiVo Roamio was made available on August 20, 2013.

Hardware:
 CPU: Broadcom BCM7241  3000 Dhrystone MIPS
 Transcoder: NXP (Freescale / Zenverge) ZN200 (Roamio Plus and Pro only)

Series6 Bolt (2015) 

The Bolt was made available for sale on September 30, 2015.

Hardware:
 CPU: Broadcom BCM7449

Series7 Edge (2019) 

This is the first TiVo to be manufactured by Arris. It is also the first TiVo that can only use TE4 (TiVo Experience 4) and not TE3.

Other hardware

Mini

Mini VOX Specs:
 12,000 DMIPS CPU
 2GB DRAM
 8GB eMMC Flash
 Video decode up to 4Kp60
 Graphics 1.2 Gp/s OpenGL ES3.1, scalable video-in-graphics
 HDMI 2.0a output (supporting HDR10)
 Gigabit Ethernet 10/100/1000
 MoCA 2.0 Interface (400+Mbps)

Stream

Introduced in 2012, Stream is an accessory that enables streaming (sometimes called "second-screen" viewing) from TiVo Premiere or Roamio DVRs to mobile devices, including iOS and Android smartphones and tablets using the TiVo app.

Stream is a transcoder.  It converts recorded MPEG-2 content from the Premiere or Roamio DVR to a reduced data rate format suitable for the mobile client on a wireless connection (H.264, usually at 720p.)   Stream's hardware core is a specialized chip: the NXP (formerly Zenverge) ZN200.

Stream connects to the TiVo DVR via Ethernet on the customer's local network.  On the mobile device, TiVo App discovers Stream and sets it up for use.  The TiVo App user then selects a program from their DVR for viewing or downloading on their device. Downloading is at up to 4x the display rate; view-while-download is also possible. Stream can handle multiple mobile TiVo App client sessions at the same time.

Roamio Plus and Roamio Pro have Stream capability built-in, with identical capabilities to standalone Stream.

TiVo BOLT supports streaming with its own transcoder. It is also compatible with Stream for users who need to support more clients or faster downloading.

TiVo announced at CES 2020 on January 7, 2020, a new streaming product called TiVo Stream 4K. This is a new product and has no relation to the previously released TiVo Stream hardware.

Bridge
Bridge is an accessory to connect an Ethernet network to MoCA. It supports Ethernet (10/100/Gbit) and MoCA 2.0 (up to 450Mbit/s) connections. The Bridge is most often used to connect a whole-home TiVo DVR + Mini network to the household WAN/LAN router. It can also be used to add MoCA networking to TiVo DVRs that do not include it, such as the two-tuner Premiere and the Roamio.

MoCA networking is a popular choice for whole-home DVR systems because, unlike Ethernet, it uses ordinary RG-6 coaxial cabling which may already be installed in the customer's home. It is also often used in place of wireless as it provides a reliable, fade-free connection robust enough to handle even high-rate MPEG-2 video from the DVR.

TiVo app

TiVo announced an iPad app on November 22, 2010.  The app allows customers to manage their TiVos from their iPad.

The TiVo companion app for iPad was released in the weeks following its announcement.

The app works with TiVo Premiere, Premiere XL, Premiere 4, Premiere XL4, and Roamio boxes. Limited functionality is also available for Series 3 devices.

TiVo also released apps for the iPhone and Android devices.  TiVo's Director of Retail and Channel Marketing, Bard Williams, stated the app: "...offers ... complete control over management and program selection, a multi-touch remote that features gestures-based navigation, and the ability to manage and navigate Season Pass recording, your queue and info about cast, crew, similar shows – without interrupting your TV experience...When you're not at home, the app still lets you interact with your Premiere for basic management and recording tasks."

References

External links
Official website
TiVopedia.com - a resource for everything about TiVo DVRs

Digital video recorders
Linux-based devices
Digital Video Recorders